Bahía Negra is a district in the department of Alto Paraguay, Paraguay. Located on the right bank of the Paraguay River its population count is estimated to be around 2537, as of 2023.

References 

Populated places in the Alto Paraguay Department